John Michael Breckin (born 16 May 1946) better known as Mike Breckin is a retired British international fencer.

Fencing career
He competed in the individual and team foil events at the 1968 and 1972 Summer Olympics.

In 1969, he won the foil title at the British Fencing Championships. The following year in 1970, he represented England and won double gold in the foil team and individual events, at the 1970 British Commonwealth Games in Edinburgh, Scotland.

References

1946 births
Living people
British male fencers
Olympic fencers of Great Britain
Fencers at the 1968 Summer Olympics
Fencers at the 1972 Summer Olympics
People from Beckenham
Sportspeople from London
Commonwealth Games medallists in fencing
Commonwealth Games gold medallists for England
Fencers at the 1970 British Commonwealth Games
Medallists at the 1970 British Commonwealth Games